John Burton (7 May 1837 – 19 February 1887) was an English cricketer. He played twelve first-class matches for Kent between 1862 and 1864.

References

External links
 

1837 births
1887 deaths
English cricketers
Kent cricketers
People from Faversham
Sportspeople from Kent